The apple tentiform leafminer (Phyllonorycter malella) is a moth of the family Gracillariidae. It is known from Kazakhstan, Kyrgyzstan, Russia (Altai), Tajikistan, Turkmenistan and Uzbekistan.

The larvae feed on Cotoneaster hissarica, Crataegus species (including Crataegus hissarica), Cydonia species (including Cydonia oblonga), Malus species (including Malus domestica, Malus pumila and Malus sieversii) and Pyrus communis. They mine the leaves of their host plant. The mine is found on the underside of the leaf. The lower epidermis has many longitudinal folds.

Larval behaviour in using leaf vibration to avoid parasitism has been studied. The larvae use the vibrations to avoid the ovipositor of its parasitoid Sympiesis sericeicornis that is ejected into the mine.

References

malella
Moths of Asia
Moths described in 1931